Cheliyama (also referred to as Cheyama) is a village in the Raghunathpur II CD block in the Raghunathpur subdivision of the Purulia district in the state of West Bengal, India.

Geography

Location

Area overview
Purulia district forms the lowest step of the Chota Nagpur Plateau. The general scenario is undulating land with scattered hills. Raghunathpur subdivision occupies the northern part of the district. 83.80% of the population of the subdivision  lives in rural areas. However, there are pockets of urbanization and 16.20% of the population lives in urban areas. There are 14 census towns in the subdivision. It is presented in the map given alongside. There is a coal mining area around Parbelia and two thermal power plants are there – the 500 MW Santaldih Thermal Power Station and the 1200 MW Raghunathpur Thermal Power Station. The subdivision has a rich heritage of old temples, some of them belonging to the 11th century or earlier. The Banda Deul is a monument of national importance. The comparatively more recent in historical terms, Panchkot Raj has interesting and intriguing remains in the area.

Note: The map alongside presents some of the notable locations in the subdivision. All places marked in the map are linked in the larger full screen map.

Demographics
According to the 2011 Census of India, Cheyama had a total population of 7,413 of which 3,809 (51%) were males and 3,604 (49%) were females. There were 853 persons in the age range of 0–6 years. The total number of literate persons in Cheyama was 4,758 (72.53% of the population over 6 years).

Civic administration

CD block HQ
The headquarters of Raghunathpur II CD block are located at Chelyama.

Transport
The State Highway 8 running from Santaldih (in the Purulia district) to Majhdia (in the Nadia district) passes through Chelyama.

Education
Santaldih College was established in 2008 at Usir, PO Chatarmahul.

Cheleyma Bijoli Prova High School is a Bengali-medium coeducational institution established in 1945. It has facilities for teaching from class V to class XII. It has a library with 2,100 books.

Cheleyama B.C.Girls H.S. High School is a Bengali-medium girls only institution established in 1960. It has facilities for teaching from class V to class XII.

Culture
There is a Radha Vinod temple, dated 1619 Sakabda (around 17th century), at Cheliyama. The richly decorated terracotta depict Krishnalila (divine love of Krishna) and Ramayana scenes.

Achkoda, like Cheliyama, showcases aatchala-style temples with terracotta work on the walls. However, while there has been restoration at Cheliyama, Achkoda remains untouched.

There is an 11th-century rekha deul at Banda, 1 km away.

Terracotta panels in Radha Vinod temple

Healthcare
Banda (Cheliyama) Rural Hospital, with 30 beds at Cheliyama, is the major government medical facility in the Raghunathpur II CD block.

References

External links

Villages in Purulia district